Charles Laurie Dolph (August 27, 1918 – June 1, 1994) was a professor of mathematics, known for his research in applied mathematics and engineering.

Biography
Dolph graduated from the University of Michigan with A.B. in 1939 and from Princeton University with M.A. in 1941 and Ph.D. in 1944. His thesis advisor was Salomon Bochner. Dolph was from 1943 to 1944 a physicist in the U.S. Naval Research Laboratory and from 1944 to 1945 an ensign in the U.S. Navy.

From 1945 to 1946 Dolph worked for Michigan Bell Telephone Laboratories. In 1946 he joined the University of Michigan faculty as a lecturer with a joint appointment in the department of mathematics and in the department of engineering research at the Engineering Research Institute. At the University of Michigan's department of mathematics he became in 1947 an assistant professor, in 1954 an associate professor, and in 1960 a full professor, retiring in 1988 as professor emeritus.

In 1982 Dolph, an Ann Arbor native, and his first wife donated the land for the Dolph Park Nature Area to the City of Ann Arbor. The land, consisting of 57 acres with 2 lakes, was originally owned by his parents.

He directed four doctoral theses and was three times a visiting professor at German universities. He was an associate editor for the Journal of Mathematical Analysis and Applications.

In 1944 in New Jersey, Dolph married Marjorie Louise Tibert (1918–2010). They divorced after three of their four children died, and Dolph remarried. He died in 1994.

Awards and honors
 1946 Thompson Prize from the Institute of Radio Engineers
 1947 J. Browder Thompson Award from the Institute of Electrical and Electronics Engineers
 1957–58 Guggenheim Fellowship, spent as a sabbatical year at the Technical Universities of Munich and Aachen

Selected publications

References

1918 births
1994 deaths
University of Michigan alumni
Princeton University alumni
20th-century American mathematicians
Applied mathematicians
United States Navy personnel of World War II
United States Navy officers